Multiple complex developmental disorder (MCDD) is a research category, proposed to involve several neurological and psychological symptoms where at least some symptoms are first noticed during early childhood and persist throughout life.  It was originally suggested to be a subtype of autistic spectrum disorders (PDD) with co-morbid schizophrenia or another psychotic disorder; however, there is some controversy that not everyone with MCDD meets criteria for both PDD and psychosis.  The term multiplex developmental disorder was coined by Donald J. Cohen in 1986.

Diagnostic criteria
The current diagnostic criteria for MCDD are a matter of debate due to it not being in the DSM-V or ICD-10.  Various websites contain various diagnostic criteria.  At least three of the following categories should be present.  Co-occurring clusters of symptoms must also not be better explained by being symptoms of another disorder such as experiencing mood swings due to autism, cognitive difficulties due to schizophrenia, and so on.  The exact diagnostic criteria for MCDD remain unclear but may be a useful diagnosis for people who do not fall into any specific category.  It could also be argued that MCDD is a vague and unhelpful term for these patients.

Psychotic symptoms
Criteria are met for a psychotic disorder.

Some symptoms may include: 
Delusions, such as thought insertion, paranoid preoccupations, fantasies of personal omnipotence, over engagement with fantasy figures, grandiose fantasies of special powers, referential ideation, and confusion between fantasy and real life.
Hallucinations and/or unusual perceptual experiences.
Negative symptoms (anhedonia, affective flattening, alogia, avolition)
Disorganized behavior and/or speech such as thought disorder, easy confusability, inappropriate emotions/facial expressions, uncontrollable laughter, etc.
Catatonic behavior.

Affective and behavioral symptoms
These symptoms are not due to situations such as, person is depressed because of difficulty making friends.  It is normal to experience dysfunctional emotions and behaviors at times. 
Criteria are met for a neurotic or personality disorder, preferably at least two.

Some symptoms may include: 
Depression.
Mania.
Anxiety.
Anger.
Dissociative symptoms such as depersonalization, derealization, deja vu, etc.
Emotional instability.
Psychopathic behavior.
Narcissism.
Paranoia.
Obsessive-compulsive behavior.

Autistic symptoms
Criteria are met for an autistic spectrum disorder.

Some symptoms may include: 
Difficulty with social skills.
Repetitive behaviour and patterns.
Sensory processing disorder. (Poor motor skills, poor auditory processing, poor depth perception, etc.)
Alexithymia. (Difficulty expressing self, difficulty understanding emotions, literal concrete thinking, etc.)
Lack of eye contact.
Intense, singular interests.
Low interest in dress up games during childhood.

Neurological symptoms
Because these are frequently found in cases of autistic disorders, criteria could be met for multiple neurological disorders, or cause severe symptoms.

Some examples include:
Learning difficulties symptoms such as dyslexia, dysgraphia, dyscalcula, NVLD, slow learning, poor memory, etc.
AD/HD symptoms such as poor concentration, poor decision making, poor judgement, impulsiveness, difficulty sitting still, etc.
Synesthesia.
Neurological sleep disorders such as narcolepsy, insomnia, circadian rhythm disorder, etc.
Conditions affecting perceptions and/or cognition, such as agnosia, aphasia, etc.
Tourette syndrome or Tic disorder.
Epilepsy or Seizure disorder.
Parkinsonian syndrome features such as tremors, stiff movements, etc.

Causes
Multiple complex developmental disorder is likely to be caused by a number of different various genetic factors.  Each individual with MCDD is unique from one another and displays different symptoms.  Various neuropsychological disorders can also be found in family members of people with MCDD.

References

External links 
https://web.archive.org/web/20140119071845/http://medicine.yale.edu/childstudy/autism/information/mdd.aspx

Pervasive developmental disorders
Nervous system